The year 2000 saw the release of numerous video games as well as the launch of the PlayStation 2. Critically acclaimed games originally released in 2000 include sequels such as Chrono Cross, Baldur's Gate II, Diablo II, Dragon Quest VII, Final Fantasy IX, Metal Gear: Ghost Babel, NFL 2K1, Resident Evil – Code: Veronica, The Legend of Zelda: Majora's Mask, and Tony Hawk's Pro Skater 2, along with new intellectual properties such as Deus Ex, Jet Set Radio, Perfect Dark, Skies of Arcadia, The Sims, Vagrant Story, and Sin and Punishment. The year's best-selling home video games worldwide were Pokémon games for the third year in a row (since 1998), while the highest-grossing arcade game in Japan was Virtua Striker 2.

Hardware releases
The list of game-related hardware released in 2000.

Top-rated games

Game of the Year awards 
The following titles won Game of the Year awards for 2000.

Critically acclaimed titles

Famitsu Platinum Hall of Fame
The following video game releases in 2000 entered Famitsu magazine's "Platinum Hall of Fame" for receiving Famitsu scores of at least 35 out of 40.

Metacritic and GameRankings 
Metacritic (MC) and GameRankings (GR) are aggregators of video game journalism reviews.

Financial performance

Best-selling video game consoles

Best-selling home video games 
The following titles were the top ten best-selling home video games of 2000 in Japan, the United States, United Kingdom, and Germany.

The following titles were the top ten highest-grossing home video games of 2000 in the United States and Europe.

Japan
In Japan, the following titles were the top ten best-selling home video games of 2000.

United States
In the United States, the following titles were the top ten best-selling home video games of 2000.

The following titles were the year's top six highest-grossing home video game franchises in the United States, in terms of video game software sales revenue.

Europe 
In Europe, the following titles were the top ten highest-grossing home video games of 2000.

In the United Kingdom and France, the following titles were the best-selling home video games of 2000.

In Germany, the following titles were the best-selling home video games of 2000.

Australia 
In Australia, the following titles were the top ten best-selling console games of 2000.

Highest-grossing arcade games in Japan 
In Japan, the following titles were the top ten highest-grossing arcade games of 2000.

Major events

Notable releases

Series with new installments include Age of Empires, Banjo-Kazooie, Command & Conquer, Diablo, Excite, Final Fantasy, Grandia, The Legend of Zelda, Madden NFL, Marvel vs. Capcom, Mega Man Legends, Monkey Island, Mortal Kombat, Need for Speed, Persona, Pokémon, Resident Evil, Ridge Racer, Sonic the Hedgehog, Spyro, Tekken, Tom Clancy's Rainbow Six, Tony Hawk's, and Wario.

In addition, 2000 saw the introduction of several new properties, including Counter-Strike, Deus Ex, Hitman, Jet Set Radio, Kessen, Mario Tennis, Midnight Club, Paper Mario, Perfect Dark, The Sims, SSX, TimeSplitters, and Total War.

See also
2000 in games

References

 
Video games by year